36 ore all'inferno  or 36 Hours to Hell is an Italian  war action film released in 1969. It stars Richard Harrison and Pamela Tudor.

References

External links
 

1969 films
1960s Italian-language films
1960s action war films
Pacific War films
Macaroni Combat films
Films directed by Roberto Bianchi Montero
1960s Italian films